Carrier oil, also known as base oil or vegetable oil, is used to dilute essential oils and absolutes before they are applied to the skin in massage and aromatherapy.  They are so named because they carry the essential oil onto the skin. Diluting essential oils is a critical safety practice when using essential oils. Essential oils alone are volatile; they begin to dissipate as soon as they are applied. The rate of dispersion will vary based on how light or heavy the carrier oil is. Carrier oils do not contain a concentrated aroma, unlike essential oils, though some, such as olive, have a mild distinctive smell. Neither do they evaporate like essential oils, which are more volatile. The carrier oils used should be as natural and unadulterated as possible. Many people feel organic oils are of higher quality. Cold-pressing and maceration are the two main methods of producing carrier oils.

There is a range of different carrier oils, each with a various therapeutic properties. Choosing an oil will depend on the area being massaged, the presenting conditions and the clients sensitivity and requirements. For massage, viscosity is a major consideration; for example, grape seed oil is typically very thin, while olive oil is much thicker. Sunflower, sweet almond and grape seed oils have viscosities midway between these extremes. Carrier oils can be easily blended to combine their properties of viscosity, acceptability, lubrication, absorption, aroma and so forth.

Infused oils are a combination of a carrier oil and plant material and they can be either commercially or domestically prepared. A base oil, often sunflower, is placed in an airtight container with the appropriate plant material for a time. Calendula and carrot oils are produced in this way.

High quality oils sold for culinary use are often eminently suitable for massage use, and are economical; those obtained by cold pressing are preferred. All carrier oils should be kept cool, and away from strong light, to retard rancidification. Rancid oils should be avoided. Refrigerating oils helps preserve their freshness but some oils should not be refrigerated (e.g. avocado). Very cold oils may appear cloudy, but regain their clear state on returning to room temperature.

Sources passionately disagree on the suitability of mineral oil as a carrier oil. In the United States, food grade mineral oil is highly refined and purified to meet the stringent requirements of the Food and Drug Administration (FDA). Mineral oil marked as "USP" also meets the standards of the U.S. Pharmacopeia.

Varieties
True carrier oils are generally cold-pressed or macerated vegetable oils taken from, among others:
Apricot oil
Grape seed oil
Avocado oil
Olive oil
Sesame oil
Evening primrose oil
Canola (rapeseed oil)
Camellia seed oil
Sunflower oil
Marula oil
Jojoba oil
Emu oil
Castor oil
Borage seed oil
Nuts:
Walnut oil
Peanut oil
Pecan oil
Macadamia oil
Fractionated coconut oil
Hazelnut oil
Cocoa butter
Sweet almond oil

Safety aspects
Peanuts are legumes, not true nuts, but they share with true nuts the risk of causing allergic reactions, even in minute amounts. Pure peanut and nut-derived oils are not usually allergenic (as they do not typically contain the proteinaceous part of the plant), but avoiding them may be safer, as serious peanut and nut allergy is widespread, oil purity cannot be guaranteed, and other hypoallergenic oils are easily substituted.

References

Aromatherapy
Oils